The Honored Coach of Ukraine (also translated as the Merited Coach of Ukraine) is an exclusive sports title awarded to coaches for high special merits to prepare highly qualified sportspeople in individual and team sports. This tradition is an adaptation of the similar honors that existed in the Soviet Union since 1961 as the Merited Coach of the Ukrainian SSR.

Criteria for qualification

Olympic sports

Note: in parenthesis are requirements for team sports.

Non-Olympic sports

Notes: 
 In parenthesis are requirements for team sports.
 In case of participation in one sport discipline athletes from less than 10 countries, the minimum number of positions is doubled.

Paralympic games

Notes: 
 In parenthesis are requirements for team sports.

Additional requirements
 Higher or general education
 Three years work experience with an individual or a team
 Listed for national teams of Ukraine
 Approved by corresponding order from a central body of executive power for physical culture and sports

Also, coaches who do not possess special education must have a sports title "Master of Sports of Ukraine", "Master of Sports of Ukraine, World Class", or "Merited Master of Sports of Ukraine".

Sports titles of Ukraine
Honorary titles of Ukraine

Coaching awards